Anders Andersson may refer to:

Anders Andersson (footballer) (born 1974), former Swedish football forward and TV pundit
Anders Andersson (ice hockey) (1937–1989), Swedish ice hockey centre in the 1950s and 1960s
Anders Andersson (sport shooter) (1875–1945), Swedish sport shooter who competed in the 1920 Summer Olympics
Anders Andersson (canoeist) (born 1952), Swedish sprint canoer who competed in the late 1970s and early 1980s
Anders Andersson (actor) (born 1952), Swedish actor

See also 
Anders Andersen (disambiguation)

